André LaMothe is a computer scientist, author, hardware engineer, and game programmer.

Career highlights
LaMothe has written numerous books on game development and developed video games for Microsoft Windows.

LaMothe was assisted by John Romero on an early book of LaMothe's while Romero was developing Doom.

LaMothe is the hardware evangelist for the upcoming Intellivision Amico.

LaMothe is the founder of Nurve Networks LLC and iC0nstrux.com.

See also
XGameStation series
HYDRA Game Development Kit

References

Bibliography

External links

Living people
People from the San Francisco Bay Area
Video game programmers
American computer scientists
San Jose State University alumni
Year of birth missing (living people)